A Crack Up at the Race Riots is a novel written by Harmony Korine, writer of such cult films as Kids and Gummo. The book was published in 1998 by Doubleday. A new edition was later published by Drag City.

References

1998 American novels
Novels about the Ku Klux Klan
1998 debut novels